Beatriz is a given name. It may refer to:


Places
 Beatriz, Caguas, Puerto Rico, a barrio 
 Beatriz, Cayey, Puerto Rico, a barrio
 Beatriz, Cidra, Puerto Rico, a barrio

Surname
 Ana Beatriz (born 1985), Brazilian racing driver known as Bia Figueiredo
 Stephanie Beatriz (born 1981), American actress

Other uses
 Hurricane Beatriz (disambiguation), various Pacific tropical cyclones
 Beatriz (film), a 1976 Spanish-Mexican drama film

See also
Beatrice (disambiguation)
Beatrix (disambiguation)